Fioritura (meaning "flourish" or "flowering"; plural ) is the florid embellishment of  melodic lines, either notated by a composer or improvised during a performance. It usually involves lengthy, complex embellishments, as opposed to standardized local ornamental figures such as trills, mordents, or appoggiaturas, and its use is documented as early as the thirteenth century. The alternative term coloratura is less accurate. It is closely related to the sixteenth-century practice of diminution or division.

References

Sources

External links 
 Virginia Opera glossary

Italian opera terminology